Chế Năng was an Đại Việt vassal king of Champa. Chế Năng was son of king Jaya Simhavarman III and the Javanese (Yavadvipa) queen Tapasi. His name was also Simhavarman. During his reign, he tried to conquer previously lost territories of O and Ly. In 1318, the Vietnamese emperor, Tran Minh Tong, dispatched generals Tran Quoc Chan and Pham Ngu Lao to defeat Che Nang. Che Nang was defeated and escaped to Java.

References 

Kings of Champa
Hindu monarchs
14th-century Vietnamese monarchs
Vietnamese monarchs